Elmer Vernon Jack Tower (1886-1950) was an American racecar driver and riding mechanic from Flint, Michigan. Tower was the fastest qualifier at the 1913 Indianapolis 500, but started from the back row as the grid was determined by a blind draw. Tower was a manager at Studebaker, who also ran a cyclecar company. He remained involved in the car industry and had many patents to his name regarding the automotive industry. These included a clutch disk, a clutch construction device, a transmission device, a clutch plate and a steering wheel invention.

Indy 500 results

References

External links

 Jack Tower statistics at ChampCarStats.com
 

1886 births
1950 deaths
American racing drivers
Indianapolis 500 drivers